Top Model, o Reality, season 1 was the first season of the Brazilian series Top Model, o Reality, which was hosted by Ana Hickmann and co-hosted by Ticiane Pinheiro during casting weeks. Season one featured twenty-four semi finalists that were pared down to fourteen finalists in the main competition. The prizes for this season are a 150,000 Reais contract with Ana Hickmann's brand and a contract with Way Model Management.

Casting weeks
Each casting week, four contestants of a designated city were selected to earn a spot in the top 24 for this season. In the fourth and final casting week, the 14 finalists were selected to proceed to the main competition.

Episode summaries

Episode 1
Aired: September 2, 2012

The premiere episode showed the casting in the city of São Paulo and the metropolitan area of São Paulo, where the first 4 candidates of the show were selected for the Top 24.
 
Ticiane Pinheiro led this first part of the show, assisting in the process that featured two stages. The first stage featured a round with 500 contestants. Sixteen contestants were selected to participate in the second stage, leaving only 4 semi-finalists with a place in the top 24.

Selected Contestants: Eduarda Ferreira, Tamirys Macedo, Thayssa Ribeiro & Viviane Oliveira
Photographer: Gustavo Arrais
Guest Judges: Bruna di Tullio, Gustavo Sarti, Natália Guimarães, Zeca de Abreu, Wan Vieira

Episode 2
Aired: September 9, 2012

Ticiane Pinheiro keep in her journey to find beautiful models in Brazil. This time, Midwest region had its casting in Goiânia, GO. It was called 450 girls,  but only 16 passed to the second fase of casting week, and then only 4 will continuing on the show.

Selected Contestants:  Giovana Almeida, Jéssica Nobre, Scarlet Cardoso & Lais Bretas
Photographer: Cristina Diniz
Guest Judges: Gustavo Sarti, Zeca de Abreu, Natália Guimarães, Camila Rodrigues
 
The show also showed the casting on the North-Northeast region, on the city of Fortaleza, CE. 470 gils was pre-selected, but only 4 keep on the show.

Selected Contestants: Camila Andrade, Jéssica Vaz, Livia Studart & Priscila Levy
Photographer:  Caio Ferreira
Guest Judges: Gustavo Sarti, Zeca de Abreu, Marcelo Gomes, Daniela Lopes, Claudio Silveira

Episode 3
Aired: September 16, 2012

The show introduced the casting on the Southeast region of Brazil. The Southeast region had two casting weeks. The first casting was shown in episode one. The second casting was held in Rio de Janeiro, with more than 500 girls.

Selected Contestants: Adriene Scherer, Fernanda Gomes, Paloma Bicalho & Rafaella Rodrigues
Photographer: Gustavo Arrais
Guest Judges: Gustavo Sarti, Zeca de Abreu, Natália Guimarães,  Matheus Mazzafera, Gustavo Arrais
 
The South region had two casting weeks, one in Porto Alegre, and the other in Florianópolis. More than 300 girls were selected, but only 16 progressed to the second day. One of selected girls, Bárbara Santos, decided to quit the show.

Porto Alegre
Selected Contestants: Luana Reichert, Nathália Gomes, Natasha Raimundo & Sancler Frantz
Photographer: Gustavo Arrais
Guest Judges: Gustavo Sarti, Zeca de Abreu, Natália Guimarães, Matheus Mazzafera, Gustavo Arrais

Florianópolis
Selected Contestants: Cláudia de Liz, Ellen Teodoro, Fátima Correia & Mayara Gomes
Photographer: Tauana Sofia
Guest Judges Gustavo Sarti, Zeca de Abreu, Natália Guimarães, Juliane Trevisol, Tauana Sofia

Episode 4
Aired: September 23, 2012

The Top 24 first landed in São Paulo, where they find Gustavo Sardi that leads to a tour of Oscar Freire Avenue. There, the girls attend a cocktail of the program in store brand Carmen Steffens. Then the girls are brought to the Sport Spa Resort, where they find Matheus Mazzafera and can get to know better. The next day, meet again Ticiane Pinheiro and follow to the House of Ana Hickmann, in the city of Itu, SP.
 
At home, Ana Hickmann shows the mansion and announce thar only 14 girls remain in the competition, and leads to the first challenge: a runway with two looks, which one of them will bring some problem of fashions shows, like stained clothes, wrong mannequins and exchanged measures, broken shoes etc. The girls are divided into 3 groups, and at the end of the runway, the girls meet the judges and 10 girls are eliminated.

Selected Contestants: Camila Andrade, Eduarda Ferreira, Fátima Correia, Fernanda Gomes, Jessica Nobre, Jessica Vaz, Livia Studart, Luana Reichert, Natália Gomes, Paloma Bicalho, Rafaella Rodrigues, Sancler Frantz, Tamirys Macedo & Viviane Oliveira
Eliminated: Adriane Scherer, Claudia Liz, Ellen, Giovanna Verissimo, Laiz Gomes, Mayara, Natasha, Priscila Levi, Scarlet Cardoso & Thayssa Ribeiro
Special Guests: Ticiane Pinheiro, Matheus Mazzafera and Carmen Steffens
Guests Judges: Dudu Bertholini, Zeca de Abreu, Marcelo Gomes

Episode 5
Aired: September 30, 2012

The 14 remaining girls start their day with a lesson on the catwalk with Namie Wihby. He says the girls still need a lot of practice, but some already have the walking acceptable. For the challenge, Ana prepares a play pillow fight, where the girls should overthrow their opponents in a pile of mattresses or at the pool. In the end, the dispute was between Camila and Rafaella, who wins the challenge by 	
throwing Camila at the pool. Camila was very angry because she told to Rafaella that she could not swim. In her defense, Rafaella said that it was a game, and she never plays to lose.

Later, Ana prepares a conversation with the girls, who must answer truthfully why their competitors would not be able to win the competition. This conversation warmed the spirits in the house, creating enmity between Rafaella and Livia.

For the photographic challenge, Ana asks the girls to take off their shirts, to realize a photoshoot in jeans with the presence of male models. Some girls did very well, as Sancler and Eduarda, who showed they are not ashamed of their bodies and have a lot of skill to control them. But some girls had difficulty with the photoshoot as Jessica N., who was uncomfortable with the challenge, and Jessica V., who cared too much about other things, like her hair and the presence of the jurors. Meanwhile, Livia thought it would be disrespectful to her family show up naked on national television, so she decided not to make the challenge.

At the end, Jessica V. and Livia were in the bottom two, and it was the absence of a photo of Livia that made she be eliminated.

Bottom two: Jessica Vaz & Livia Studart
Eliminated: Livia Studart

Episode 6
Aired: October 7, 2012

Bottom two: Jessica Vaz & Luana Reichert
Eliminated: Luana Reichert

Episode 7
Aired: October 14, 2012

First call-out: Eduarda Ferreira
Bottom three: Jessica Vaz, Nathália Gomes & Tamirys Macedo
Eliminated: Jessica Vaz & Tamirys Macedo

Episode 8
Aired: October 21, 2012

Bottom three:  Fernanda Gomes, Jessica Nobre & Nathália Gomes
Eliminated:  Jessica Nobre & Nathália Gomes

Episode 9
Aired: October 28, 2012

Bottom three: Fátima Correia, Fernanda Gomes & Viviane Oliveira
Eliminated:   Viviane Oliveira

Episode 10
Aired: November 4, 2012

Bottom three: Camila Andrade, Fátima Correia & Fernanda Gomes
Eliminated: Fátima Correia & Fernanda Gomes

Episode 11
Aired: November 11, 2012

Bottom two: Rafaella Rodrigues & Sancler Frantz 
Eliminated: Rafaella Rodrigues

Episode 12
Aired: November 18, 2012

Bottom two: Camila Andrade & Eduarda Ferreira
Eliminated: Eduarda Ferreira

Live Finale
Aired: November 25, 2012

Final three: Camila Andrade, Paloma Bicalho & Sancler Frantz
Eliminated: Sancler Frantz
Final two: Camila Andrade & Paloma Bicalho
Winner: Camila Andrade

Contestants

(ages stated are at start of contest)

Results

 The contestant was in danger of elimination
 The contestant was in the bottom two
 The contestant was eliminated
 The contestant was one of the best performers of the week
 The contestant won the competition

 In this show, there is no solid call-out order. Only the bottom or top contestants are announced every week with the eliminated girl being pointed out. The rest of the girls progress collectively to the following week.
Episodes 1, 2 and 3 were casting episodes.
In Episode 4, the 24 semifinalists were narrowed down to 14 contestants that would move on in the main competition. This first call-out does not reflect on their performance that week.
In Episode 6, each of the judges had to name two girls who they thought were the weakest. Out of these, Jéssica V. and Luana were pointed out as the bottom two.
 Episode 13 was the live finale.

Photo shoot guide
Episodes 1-3 photo shoots: Posing in swimwear
Episode 5 photo shoot: Topless with Biotipo jeans
Episode 6 photo shoot: Swimwear in a meat freezer
Episode 7 photo shoot & commercial: Underwater glamour; fake top model products
Episode 8 photo shoot: Leopard print dresses with animals  
Episode 10 photo shoot: Extreme sports 
Episode 11 photo shoot: Body painting
Episode 12 commercial: Nude commercial
Episode 13 photo shoot: Beauty shots with a neon ring
 In episodes 4 and 9, the shoots were replaced by fashion shows.

References

External links
Official website

2012 Brazilian television seasons
Brazil